The Retezat Mountains are some of the highest massifs in Romania, being part of the Southern Carpathians.

The area also contains the Retezat National Park, Romania's first national park.

External links
 Pictures and images from the Carpathian Mountains
Official site
Maps of the Park
Jiu Valley Portal - the home of the Official Jiu Valley City Websites and a gateway to the Retezat National Park and other destinations in the Transylvanian Alps
Maps of the Retezat and other mountain ranges in the Transylvanian Alps
Touristic Maps of the Retezat Mountains

Mountains of Romania
Mountains of the Southern Carpathians